Brestanica railway station is the principal railway station in Brestanica, Slovenia.

References

External links 

Official site of the Slovenian railways 

Railway stations in Slovenia
Municipality of Krško